Wasp Star (Apple Venus Volume 2) is the fourteenth  studio album by the English rock band XTC, released 23 May 2000 on Cooking Vinyl/Idea Records. Defined by bandmember Andy Partridge as the "eclectric" counterpart to 1999's Apple Venus Volume 1, it consists of rock-based material largely written between 1994 and 1996. Wasp Star reached number 40 on the UK Albums Chart. In 2002, the group released an instrumental version of the album entitled Waspstrumental. XTC dissolved in 2006, leaving Wasp Star their last studio album to date.

Track listing

Personnel
XTC
Colin Moulding – vocals, bass guitar, harmonica on "In Another Life", guitar on "Boarded Up"
Andy Partridge – vocals, guitar

Additional personnel

Caroline Dale – cello
Nick Davis – keyboards
Simon Gardner – flugelhorn
Patrick Kiernan – violin
Peter Lale – viola
Holly Partridge – backing vocals on "Playground"
Prairie Prince – drums (2–4, 12)
Chuck Sabo – drums (1, 6–11)
Kate St. John – oboe
Matthew Vaughan – programming
Gavyn Wright – violin

Production

Haydn Bendall – recording engineering
Nick Davis – producer, mixing, recording engineering
Simon Dawson – mix engineer
Alan Douglas – recording engineering
Barry Hammond – recording engineering
Bob Ludwig – mastering
Leonard B. Johnson – A&R Coordination

Charts

References

External links
 Wasp Star (Apple Venus Volume 2) on Chalkhills

2000 albums
Albums produced by Nick Davis (record producer)
Cooking Vinyl albums
XTC albums
Sequel albums